Early growth response protein 4 (EGR-4), also known as AT133, is a protein that in humans is encoded by the EGR4 gene.

EGR-4 is a member of the early growth response (EGF) family of zinc finger transcription factors.

References

Further reading

Molecular neuroscience
Transcription factors
Zinc proteins